Selinsgrove Area School District is a mid-sized, suburban/rural public school district centered in Selinsgrove, Pennsylvania in eastern Snyder County, Pennsylvania. The district is one of the 500 public school districts of Pennsylvania. According to 2000 federal census data, it serves a resident population of 21,015 people. In 2010 the district's population increased to 22,259 people. District enrollment has declined to approximately 2700 students clustered on a campus located in the borough of Selinsgrove. The Pennsylvania Department of Education projected a continued decline in enrollment to 2,500 in 2010. The educational attainment levels for the Selinsgrove Area School District population (25 years old and over) were 85.4% high school graduates and 20.8% college graduates. In 2014, Superintendent Chad Cohrs reported that 80 children are homeschooled, rather attend district schools.

According to the Pennsylvania Budget and Policy Center, 39.5% of the district's pupils lived at 185% or below the Federal Poverty level as shown by their eligibility for the federal free or reduced price school meal programs in 2012. Per the Pennsylvania Department of Education, Selinsgrove Area School District had 784 students receiving free or reduced-price lunches due to low family income in the 2007–08 school year. According to the National Center for Education Statistics, Selinsgrove Area School Districts also had 71 students who were identified as English language learners in 2008. In 2009, the district residents’ per capita income was $17,857, while the median family income was $44,742. In the Commonwealth, the median family income was $49,501 and the United States median family income was $49,445, in 2010.

Selinsgrove Area High school students may choose to attend SUN Area Technical Institute, located in New Berlin, for training in the: culinary, allied health, construction and mechanical trades. The Central Susquehanna Intermediate Unit IU16 provides the district with a wide variety of services like specialized education for disabled students and hearing, speech and visual disability services and professional development for staff and faculty.

The Selinsgrove Area School District's mascot is the Selinsgrove Braves.

Schools
Selinsgrove Area High School grades nine to twelve. The school uses a modified, five-period, block scheduling program.
Selinsgrove Area Middle School serves students in grades sixth, seventh and eighth
Selinsgrove Area Intermediate School serves students grades third to fifth
Selinsgrove Area Elementary School serves all-day kindergarten to second

In May 2011, the board voted to realign the schools moving grade six to the Intermediate School and shifting the management team. In 2012, the board approved shifting the sixth grade back to the middle school. Jackson-Penn Elementary School, located in Penn Township, was closed in December 2009. It had served as the district's Kindergarten Center for two years. In 2013, the board rented the former Jackson-Penn building to a private special needs student school called New Day.

Extracurriculars
The district offers an extensive variety of clubs, activities and sports.

Clubs and organizations
Selinsgrove's student life programs include: French Club, Technology Student Association, Forensics (of the National Forensic League), Chess club, FFA, Student Government, German Club, Key Club, SADD Club, Spanish Club, and Web Heads. Students from the school have been notably successful in participating in Pennsylvania History Day and the Pennsylvania Mock Trial Competition.

Music and performance
The school's music program offers both band instrumental and voice training. Annual concerts are conducted by programs at the high school and middle school. Students have access to free instrument lessons beginning in the elementary schools.

Band
The Selinsgrove Area High School Marching Band supports the community by playing at local events like the annual Memorial Day ceremony and the Market Street Festival. Selinsgrove's band also performs each week at the school's football games; they perform in concert form at least once per semester. The band has played at Canadian football games and marched in several Disney World holiday parades.

Chorus
The Honors Chorus has performed at Carnegie Hall and at the dedication of the National World War II Memorial in Washington, DC as the representative of Pennsylvania. The 2005–2006 chorus premiered Matthew Harris' piece, "Oceanic Eyes".

Theater
Students can also elect to participate on-stage in Selinsgrove's 2 plays or annual musical. Notable productions in recent years include "The Little Shop of Horrors", "Annie Get Your Gun", Rodgers and Hammerstein's Cinderella, "Jesus Christ Superstar", "Footloose", and "Copacabana".

Athletics
The interscholastic athletic program offers students a plethora of opportunities to develop sport-related skills. Some sports offer multiple levels beginning the middle school. Several of the school's teams have excelled, including the bowling, field hockey, girls' basketball and football teams. Selinsgrove participates in various sports through the Pennsylvania Interscholastic Athletic Association and is a founding member of the Pennsylvania Heartland Athletic Conference.

In 2009, the school's football team captured the PIAA class AAA state football championship by defeating Manheim Central by a score of 10–7 for the school's first state football championship and the second overall championship; the first being Track & Field in 1974.

Boys Sports
Baseball
Basketball (HS V & 9th, JHS 7th & 8th)
Bowling
Cross country
Football (Varsity, JV, 9th grade, JHS)
Golf
Soccer (HS, MS)
Tennis
Track and field
Wrestling (HS, JHS)

Girls Sports
Basketball (HS, JHS)
Bowling
Cheerleading (HS, JHS)
Cross-country
Field hockey (HS, JHS)
Soccer (HS, MS)
Softball
Tennis
Track and field
Wrestling (HS, JHS)

References

School districts in Snyder County, Pennsylvania
Snyder County, Pennsylvania
Susquehanna Valley
Education in Snyder County, Pennsylvania